Protein SET, also known as Protein SET 1, is a protein that in humans is encoded by the SET gene.

Interactions 

Protein SET has been shown to interact with:

 Acidic leucine-rich nuclear phosphoprotein 32 family member A, 
 CDK5R1, 
 KLF5,
 NME1,  and
 TAF1A.

References

Further reading 

 
 
 
 
 
 
 
 
 
 
 
 
 
 
 
 
 

Histone Acetyltransferase Inhibitor